The Kuching Declaration (Iban: Jaku penetap Kuching, Malay: Perisytiharan Kuching) is a declaration in English was adopted by the three component parties of the Pakatan Rakyat  (i.e. People's Justice Party (PKR) signed by Anwar Ibrahim and Baru Bian, Democratic Action Party (DAP) signed by Lim Kit Siang and Wong Ho Leng, Pan-Malaysian Islamic Party (PAS) signed by Abdul Hadi Awang and Adam Ahid) coincide with Malaysia Day celebrations on 16 September 2012 held at Chonglin Park, Kuching, Sarawak, the declaration pledge and promise will honour the spirit of the Malaysia Agreement of 1963 to the nations and the peoples of the States of Sarawak and Sabah that when they form the next government of the Malaysia they will honour all its pledges and promises in this declaration.

The Declaration

English

Lest we forget, and lest all the peoples of our great Nation of Malaysia forget, we the undersigned do once again firmly, resolutely and unequivocally pledge and promise before the whole Nation of Malaysia as our witness, on this historically day 16 September 2012, in the City of Kuching, and on behalf of our respective parties and Pakatan Rakyat will honour all its pledges and promises to the peoples of Malaysia.

We will honourably execute all the policies set forth in the Buku Jingga so that Malaysia will once again be a great Nation, her peoples prosperous, her future secure and peaceful, and her name celebrated by all the nations of the world.

We will honour the spirit of the Malaysia Agreement of 1963 which our founding fathers put their hands to, and as a sign of our deep commitment to the peoples of Sarawak and Sabah, consistent with democratic principles and justice for all Malaysians, in particular:

ARTICLE ONE: EQUAL PARTNERS
We will restore the spirit of the Malaysia Agreement and the position of Sarawak and Sabah as equal partners within Malaysia by restoring autonomy to Sarawak and Sabah within the framework of the Federal Constitution.

ARTICLE TWO: FAIR REPRESENTATION
We will increase national integration between Sarawak, Sabah and Peninsular Malaysia through a fair power-sharing arrangement that fully upholds the spirit of the Malaysia Agreement.

ARTICLE THREE: CITIZENSHIP
We will set up a Royal Commission to solve the perennial national problem of illegal immigration and citizenship, particularly in Sarawak and Sabah.

ARTICLE FOUR: RESTORATION OF NATIVE CUSTOMARY RIGHTS OVER LAND
We will endorse the authority already vested in the State Laws of Sarawak and Sabah to set up Land Commissions to investigate, resolve disputes, redress, survey and restore Native Customary Rights over Native Customary Lands.

ARTICLE FIVE: COMPETENT SARAWAK AND SABAH
We will endorse the appointment of Sarawak and Sabah citizens to head Government Departments in their own respective States and by the powers vested in the State Secretaries of both States as well as give first priority to the appointment of Sarawak and Sabah citizens at Federal Government level functioning within Sarawak and Sabah.

ARTICLE SIX: OIL JUSTICE
We will raise the royalties paid on petroleum and hydrocarbon resources to Sarawak and Sabah to 20% from the present 5%.

ARTICLE SEVEN: EQUITABLE DEVELOPMENT
We will bring the level of infrastructure development in Sarawak and Sabah up to par with Peninsular Malaysia.

We, the undersigned, make this declaration as an incontrovertible contract between the Pakatan Rakyat and the peoples of Malaysia, this historic day of 16 September 2012 on Malaysia Day, so that it may ring out resoundingly from Malaysia’s high forest hills down to the open sea; so that freedom may ever reign; and our peoples live in unity!

In witness whereof the undersigned, being duly authorised thereto, have signed this Declaration, and all the peoples of Malaysia being witnesses thereof.

Done at Kuching, this 16th day of September, 2012, in six copies of which one shall be deposited with each of the signatories.

Iban

In Malay

See also
 Malaysia Agreement
 Malaysia Act 1963
 Manila Accord
 20-point agreement
 United Nations General Assembly Resolution 1514 (XV)
 United Nations General Assembly Resolution 1541 (XV)

References

External links
 The Kuching Declaration in YouTube

Sources of law
Statutory law
Legal reasoning
Legal procedure
Civil procedure
Government documents
Politics of Malaysia
Sabah
Sarawak
2012 in Malaysia
2012 documents